Whiskey N' Rye is an American roots rock band out of Seattle, Washington, United States, known for its explosive live show.  The band was formed in 2013 by singer/songwriter Philip Lindholm, and has since released two albums to critical acclaim.

History
Whiskey N' Rye's first album was the eponymously titled album Whiskey N' Rye, released on March 28, 2014.  The album featured the single "Bootlegger," which was picked up on AAA radio across the country.  The band was thereafter invited to perform on Blues To Do television, at the House of Blues in Hollywood, and do an in-studio with Bob Rivers on Seattle's 95.7 KJR-FM.  These performances led to Whiskey N' Rye's music appearing across popular television shows, including The Real World and Keeping up with the Kardashians.

Band members
 Philip Lindholm — vocals and guitar
 Greg Pascale — guitars
 Marco Longo — keys
 Alex Atwood — bass
 Carson Dent — drums

References

External links
 Official website

Rock music groups from Washington (state)
Musical groups from Seattle
Musical groups established in 2013
Roots rock music groups
2013 establishments in Washington (state)